Arthur Ravenel Jr. (March 29, 1927 – January 16, 2023) was an American businessman and a Republican politician from Charleston, South Carolina. From 1987 to 1995, he served four terms in the U.S. House of Representatives.

Early life
Ravenel was born on March 29, 1927, to Arthur Ravenel, Sr. and Mary Allen Boykin.

During the waning days of World War II, the Charleston-born Ravenel enlisted in the United States Marine Corps, serving from 1945 to 1946. He received a Bachelor of Science degree from the College of Charleston in 1950, then became realtor and general contractor.

Political career 
First elected at age 25, he was a Democratic member of the South Carolina House of Representatives from 1953 to 1959.

Ravenel became a Republican in 1960 and ran many times for office. He lost elections for the South Carolina State Senate three times (1962, 1974, and 1976), for the United States House of Representatives (in a 1971 special election), and for mayor of Charleston (also 1971).

Ravenel was elected as a Republican to the South Carolina Senate in 1980. He served until 1986, when he was elected to the U.S. Congress from the Charleston-based 1st District that became open when incumbent Tommy Hartnett ran for Lt. Governor.

During his four terms in Congress, he focused his attention on constituent services, rarely sponsoring legislation.

He was reelected three more times without serious opposition. He did not run for reelection in 1994, but instead ran for governor. He finished second in the Republican primary to then State Representative David Beasley, but lost the runoff. Beasley, considered more conservative than Ravenel, went on to win the general election. In 1996, Ravenel was elected to his old seat in the state Senate, where he served until 2005.

Ravenel staged a comeback in 2006, having been elected at the age of 79 to a seat on the school board of Charleston County. Only a year earlier, he had suffered a bout of Guillain–Barré syndrome. In the same election, his son Thomas Ravenel, also a Republican, was elected state treasurer. The younger Ravenel resigned from the office after only six months following serious legal allegations.

Controversies
Ravenel said that he had run for the state Senate in 1996 specifically to seek funding for a new bridge between Charleston and Mount Pleasant to replace the John P. Grace Memorial Bridge and Silas N. Pearman Bridge.  Both bridges were nearing the end of their useful lives, and had been criticized as safety hazards.  Due to his efforts in passing laws for the new bridge's funding, fellow lawmakers voted to name the cable-stayed bridge in Charleston the Arthur Ravenel Jr. Bridge. Some felt that the bridge should not be named after Ravenel, with the head of the South Carolina Infrastructure Bank saying in 1999, "Certainly, Arthur Ravenel is a fine, decent person, but that bridge is bigger than any one individual and it should reflect all the qualities of the state and not some state senator who happens to be in the Legislature the time the structure is being built." Ravenelle himself made light of the controversy, joking after diagnosis of his illness that he might die, to the satisfaction of “those people who say you shouldn’t name things after people before they’re dead.”

Ravenel was a member of Moultrie Camp, Sons of Confederate Veterans, and a supporter of the Confederate flag being flown at the South Carolina statehouse. He provoked controversy in response to a reporter's question in 2000 when he referred to the NAACP as the "National Association for Retarded People". Asked for an apology, Ravenel, who had a son with Down’s Syndrome, offered one to those who suffered from mental conditions.

Ravenel once said that his fellow white congressional committee members operated on "black time", which he characterized as meaning "fashionably late".

Personal life and death
Ravenel died in Charleston on January 16, 2023, at the age of 95. He was buried at the cemetery of Huguenot Church in Charleston.

See also
 List of American politicians who switched parties in office

References

External links

|-

|-

|-

|-

1927 births
2023 deaths
20th-century American businesspeople
20th-century American politicians
Burials in South Carolina
Businesspeople from Charleston, South Carolina
Candidates in the 1974 United States elections
Candidates in the 1976 United States elections
Candidates in the 1994 United States elections
College of Charleston alumni
De Saussure family members
Democratic Party South Carolina state senators
Democratic Party members of the South Carolina House of Representatives
Members of Sons of Confederate Veterans
Military personnel from Charleston, South Carolina
Politicians from Charleston, South Carolina
Ravenel family
Republican Party South Carolina state senators
Republican Party members of the United States House of Representatives from South Carolina
School board members in South Carolina
United States Marine Corps personnel of World War II